Haim Hanani ( as Chaim Chojnacki– 8 April 1991) was a Polish-born Israeli mathematician, known for his contributions to combinatorial design theory, in particular for the theory of pairwise balanced designs and for the proof of an existence theorem for Steiner quadruple systems. He is also known for the Hanani–Tutte theorem on odd crossings in non-planar graphs.

Life
Hanani (Chojnacki) was born in Poland, studied in Vienna and Warsaw, and graduated with an M.A. from the University of Warsaw in 1934. He emigrated to the British Mandate of Palestine, later to become Israel, in 1935 and in 1938 received the first Ph.D. in Mathematics from the Hebrew University of Jerusalem.

In 1955 he was appointed to the faculty at Technion Institute of Technology and from 1969 to 1973 he served as the rector of Ben-Gurion University in Beersheba. In 1980 he was awarded the title of Professor Emeritus at that institution.

His early research led to the proof of the theorem devised by Richard M. Wilson on pairwise balance designs.

He wrote scholarly papers with Andries Brouwer, Paul Erdős, Alexander Schrijver, and Richard M. Wilson, among others.

His papers were published in journals such as Discrete Mathematics, the Journal of Combinatorial Theory, the European Journal of Combinatorics, and the American Mathematical Monthly.

Academic papers

References

20th-century Polish mathematicians
Polish emigrants to Mandatory Palestine
20th-century Israeli Jews
20th-century Israeli mathematicians
1912 births
1991 deaths